Naruda Donoruda is a 2016 Indian Telugu-language romantic comedy film, directed by Mallik Ram and produced by Supriya Yarlagadda and John Sudheer Pudhota. The film is a remake of the 2012 Hindi film Vicky Donor. It stars Sumanth and Pallavi Subhash in lead roles, while Tanikella Bharani plays a pivotal role. The music was composed by Sricharan Pakala and released on Aditya Music. The film was released on 4 November 2016.

Plot 
Vicky (Sumanth), an unemployed man, with seemingly no  purpose in life, lives with his grandmother and widowed mother (Rajya Lakshmi). Their family survives on a beauty parlour business. Dr Aanjaneyulu (Tanikella Bharani) runs an infertility clinic, and is in search of a good sperm donor. He comes across Vicky, and is enamored by him and his forefathers. After some convincing, Vicky eventually starts selling his sperm to Aanjaneyulu, filling the lives of many childless couples with joy. It's a win-win for Vicky and Aanjaneyulu as both grow rich.

Meanwhile, Vicky falls in love with a divorced bank employee, Aashima Roy (Pallavi Subhash). Never revealing that he's a sperm donor, Vicky marries her. But problems arise when Aashima gets to know the truth. Vicky eventually reconciles with his wife, after Aanjaneyulu helps her understand the true benefits of sperm donation.

Cast 
 Sumanth as Vikram "Vicky"
 Pallavi Subhash as Ashima Roy
 Tanikella Bharani as Dr. Anjeneyulu
 Suman Setty as Koti
 Rajyalakshmi as Vikram's mother

Soundtrack 

Music composed by Sricharan Pakala. Music released on Aditya Music.

Reception

Critical reception 
Deccan Chronicle gave 2 out of 5 stars stating "Naruda Donaruda is a fresh subject which could have been made much better. Except for Thanikella Bharani’s performance in a few scenes, the movie has nothing interesting. And it’s not a good comeback for Sumanth".
The Indian Express stated "Watch it for Tanikella Bharani’s performance. But don’t expect it to be a joyride right through. Entertainment is on offer only in parts, the rest is boring".

References

External links 
 

2016 films
2010s Telugu-language films
Indian romantic comedy films
Telugu remakes of Hindi films
Sperm donation
2016 romantic comedy films
Films scored by Sricharan Pakala